The following is an alphabetical list of articles related to the United States Commonwealth of Kentucky.

0–9

.ky.us – Internet second-level domain for the Commonwealth of Kentucky
1st Kentucky Cavalry Regiment (Confederate)
1st Kentucky Infantry Regiment (Confederate)
1st Kentucky Infantry Regiment (Union)
2nd Kentucky Infantry Regiment (Confederate)
2nd Kentucky Infantry Regiment (Union)
3rd Kentucky Infantry Regiment (Confederate)
3rd Kentucky Infantry Regiment (Union)
4th Kentucky Infantry Regiment (Confederate)
4th Kentucky Infantry Regiment (Union)
5th Kentucky Infantry Regiment (Confederate)
5th Kentucky Infantry Regiment (Union)
6th Kentucky Infantry Regiment (Confederate)
6th Kentucky Infantry Regiment (Union)
7th Kentucky Infantry Regiment (Confederate)
7th Kentucky Infantry Regiment (Union)
8th Kentucky Infantry Regiment (Confederate)
8th Kentucky Infantry Regiment (Union)
9th Kentucky Infantry Regiment (Confederate)
9th Kentucky Infantry Regiment (Union)
10th Kentucky Infantry Regiment
11th Kentucky Infantry Regiment
12th Kentucky Infantry Regiment
13th Kentucky Infantry Regiment
14th Kentucky Infantry Regiment
15th Kentucky Cavalry Regiment (Union)
15th Kentucky Infantry Regiment
15th state to join the United States of America
16th Kentucky Infantry Regiment
17th Kentucky Infantry Regiment
18th Kentucky Infantry Regiment

21st Kentucky Infantry Regiment
22nd Kentucky Infantry Regiment
23rd Kentucky Infantry Regiment
24th Kentucky Infantry Regiment
25th Kentucky Infantry Regiment
26th Kentucky Infantry Regiment
27th Kentucky Infantry Regiment
28th Kentucky Infantry Regiment
30th Kentucky Mounted Infantry Regiment
32nd Kentucky Infantry Regiment
33rd Kentucky Infantry Regiment
34th Kentucky Infantry Regiment
35th Kentucky Infantry Regiment
37th Kentucky Mounted Infantry Regiment
37th parallel north
38th parallel north
39th Kentucky Infantry Regiment
39th parallel north
40th Kentucky Infantry Regiment
41st Kentucky Infantry Regiment
42nd Kentucky Infantry Regiment
45th Kentucky Mounted Infantry Regiment
47th Kentucky Mounted Infantry Regiment
48th Kentucky Mounted Infantry Regiment
49th Kentucky Mounted Infantry Regiment
52nd Kentucky Mounted Infantry Regiment
53rd Kentucky Mounted Infantry Regiment
54th Kentucky Mounted Infantry Regiment
55th Kentucky Mounted Infantry Regiment
82nd meridian west
83rd meridian west
84th meridian west
85th meridian west
86th meridian west
87th meridian west
88th meridian west
89th meridian west

A
Adjacent states:

Agriculture in Kentucky
Airports in Kentucky
Amusement parks in Kentucky
Appalachia
Aquaria in Kentucky
commons:Category:Aquaria in Kentucky
Arboreta in Kentucky
commons:Category:Arboreta in Kentucky
Archaeology of Kentucky
:Category:Archaeological sites in Kentucky
commons:Category:Archaeological sites in Kentucky
Architecture of Kentucky
Art museums and galleries in Kentucky
commons:Category:Art museums and galleries in Kentucky
Astronomical observatories in Kentucky
commons:Category:Astronomical observatories in Kentucky
Attorney General of the Commonwealth of Kentucky

B
Battery "A" Kentucky Light Artillery
Battery "B" Kentucky Light Artillery
Battery "C" Kentucky Light Artillery
Battery "E" Kentucky Light Artillery
Battle of Augusta (1862)
Battle of Barbourville
Battle of Camp Wildcat
Battle of the Cumberland Gap (1862)
Battle of the Cumberland Gap (1863)
Battle of Cynthiana
Battle of Lebanon (Kentucky)
Battle of Lucas Bend
Battle of Middle Creek
Battle of Mill Springs
Battle of Mount Sterling
Battle of Munfordville
Battle of Paducah
Battle of Perryville
Battle of Richmond
Battle of Rowlett's Station
Battle of Sacramento (Kentucky)
Battle of Salyersville
Battle of Somerset
Battle of Tebbs Bend
Bluegrass region
Bluegrass & Backroads – Television program about places and things in the Bluegrass State
Botanical gardens in Kentucky
commons:Category:Botanical gardens in Kentucky
Buildings and structures in Kentucky
commons:Category:Buildings and structures in Kentucky

 Byrne's Artillery Battery

C

Canyons and gorges of Kentucky
commons:Category:Canyons and gorges of Kentucky
Capital of the Commonwealth of Kentucky
Capitol of the Commonwealth of Kentucky
commons:Category:Kentucky State Capitol
Caudill's Army
Caves of Kentucky
commons:Category:Caves of Kentucky
Census statistical areas of Kentucky
Churchill Downs
Cities in Kentucky
commons:Category:Cities in Kentucky
Climate of Kentucky
Climate change in Kentucky 
Coal mining in Kentucky
Cobb's Battery
Colleges and universities in Kentucky
commons:Category:Universities and colleges in Kentucky
Colony of Virginia, 1607–1776
Commonwealth of Kentucky  website
Constitution of the Commonwealth of Kentucky
Government of the Commonwealth of Kentucky
:Category:Government of Kentucky
commons:Category:Government of Kentucky
Executive branch of the government of the Commonwealth of Kentucky
Governor of the Commonwealth of Kentucky
Legislative branch of the government of the Commonwealth of Kentucky
Legislature of the Commonwealth of Kentucky
Senate of the Commonwealth of Kentucky
House of Representatives of the Commonwealth of Kentucky
Judicial branch of the government of the Commonwealth of Kentucky
Supreme Court of the Commonwealth of Kentucky
Commonwealth of Virginia, (1776–1792)
Communications in Kentucky
commons:Category:Communications in Kentucky
Companies in Kentucky
Congressional districts of Kentucky
Constitution of the Commonwealth of Kentucky

Convention centers in Kentucky
commons:Category:Convention centers in Kentucky
Counties of the Commonwealth of Kentucky
commons:Category:Counties in Kentucky
Cuisine of Kentucky
:Category:Kentucky cuisine
commons:Category:Kentucky cuisine
Culture of Kentucky
:Category:Kentucky culture
commons:Category:Kentucky culture

D
Demographics of Kentucky

E
Economy of Kentucky
:Category:Economy of Kentucky
commons:Category:Economy of Kentucky
Education in Kentucky
:Category:Education in Kentucky
commons:Category:Education in Kentucky
Elections in the Commonwealth of Kentucky
commons:Category:Kentucky elections
Environment of Kentucky
commons:Category:Environment of Kentucky

F

Fayette County, Virginia, 1780–1792
Festivals in Kentucky
commons:Category:Festivals in Kentucky
Flag of the Commonwealth of Kentucky
Forts in Kentucky
:Category:Forts in Kentucky
commons:Category:Forts in Kentucky
Frankfort, Kentucky, state capital since 1792

G

Geography of Kentucky
:Category:Geography of Kentucky
commons:Category:Geography of Kentucky
Geology of Kentucky
commons:Category:Geology of Kentucky
Ghost towns in Kentucky
:Category:Ghost towns in Kentucky
commons:Category:Ghost towns in Kentucky
Golf clubs and courses in Kentucky
Government of the Commonwealth of Kentucky  website
:Category:Government of Kentucky
commons:Category:Government of Kentucky
Governor of the Commonwealth of Kentucky
List of governors of Kentucky
Graves' Battery
Great Seal of the Commonwealth of Kentucky
Greenhouse gas emissions in Kentucky

H
Hemp in Kentucky
Heritage railroads in Kentucky
commons:Category:Heritage railroads in Kentucky
High schools of Kentucky
Higher education in Kentucky
Highway routes in Kentucky
Hiking trails in Kentucky
commons:Category:Hiking trails in Kentucky
History of Kentucky
Timeline of Kentucky history
Historical outline of Kentucky
History of Baptists in Kentucky
:Category:History of Kentucky
commons:Category:History of Kentucky
Hospitals in Kentucky
House of Representatives of the Commonwealth of Kentucky

I
Images of Kentucky
commons:Category:Kentucky
Interstate highway routes in Kentucky
Islands in Kentucky

J
Jefferson County, Virginia, 1780–1792
Jural rights

K
Kentucky  website
:Category:Kentucky
commons:Category:Kentucky
commons:Category:Maps of Kentucky
Kentucky County, Virginia, 1776–1780
Kentucky Derby
Kentucky–Indiana League
Kentucky State Capitol
KY – United States Postal Service postal code for the Commonwealth of Kentucky

L
Lakes in Kentucky
:Category:Lakes of Kentucky
commons:Category:Lakes of Kentucky
Landmarks in Kentucky
commons:Category:Landmarks in Kentucky
Lexington, Kentucky
Lexington, Kentucky, in the American Civil War
Lieutenant Governor of the Commonwealth of Kentucky
Lincoln County, Virginia, 1780–1792
Lists related to the Commonwealth of Kentucky:
List of airports in Kentucky
List of census statistical areas in Kentucky
List of cities in Kentucky
List of colleges and universities in Kentucky
List of United States congressional districts in Kentucky
List of counties in Kentucky
List of dams and reservoirs in Kentucky
List of forts in Kentucky
List of ghost towns in Kentucky
List of governors of Kentucky
List of high schools in Kentucky
List of highway routes in Kentucky
List of historic houses in Kentucky
List of hospitals in Kentucky
List of individuals executed in Kentucky
List of Interstate highway routes in Kentucky
List of islands in Kentucky
List of lakes in Kentucky
List of law enforcement agencies in Kentucky
List of lieutenant governors of Kentucky
List of museums in Kentucky
List of National Historic Landmarks in Kentucky
List of naval ships named for Kentucky
List of newspapers in Kentucky
List of parkways and named roads in Kentucky
List of people from Kentucky
List of power stations in Kentucky
List of radio stations in Kentucky
List of railroads in Kentucky
List of Registered Historic Places in Kentucky
List of rivers of Kentucky
List of school districts in Kentucky
List of state forests in Kentucky
List of state highway routes in Kentucky
List of state parks in Kentucky
List of state prisons in Kentucky
List of symbols of the Commonwealth of Kentucky
List of television stations in Kentucky
List of United States congressional delegations from Kentucky
List of United States congressional districts in Kentucky
List of United States representatives from Kentucky
List of United States senators from Kentucky
List of U.S. highway routes in Kentucky
Louisville Home Guard
Louisville, Kentucky
Louisville, Kentucky, in the American Civil War

M
Maps of Kentucky
commons:Category:Maps of Kentucky
Mass media in Kentucky
Mississippi River
Monuments and memorials in Kentucky
commons:Category:Monuments and memorials in Kentucky
Mountains of Kentucky
commons:Category:Mountains of Kentucky
Munday's 1st Battalion Kentucky Cavalry
Museums in Kentucky
:Category:Museums in Kentucky
commons:Category:Museums in Kentucky
Music of Kentucky
commons:Category:Music of Kentucky
:Category:Musical groups from Kentucky
:Category:Musicians from Kentucky

N
Named roads and parkways in Kentucky
National Forests of Kentucky
commons:Category:National Forests of Kentucky
Natural arches of Kentucky
commons:Category:Natural arches of Kentucky
Natural history of Kentucky
commons:Category:Natural history of Kentucky
Nature centers in Kentucky
commons:Category:Nature centers in Kentucky
Naval ships named for Kentucky
Newspapers of Kentucky

O
Ohio River
Orphan Brigade

P
Parkways and named roads in Kentucky
Patterson's Independent Company Kentucky Volunteer Engineers
People from Kentucky
:Category:People from Kentucky
commons:Category:People from Kentucky
:Category:People by city in Kentucky
:Category:People by county in Kentucky
:Category:People from Kentucky by occupation
Politics of Kentucky
commons:Category:Politics of Kentucky
Protected areas of Kentucky
commons:Category:Protected areas of Kentucky

Q

R
Radio stations in Kentucky
Railroad museums in Kentucky
commons:Category:Railroad museums in Kentucky
Railroads in Kentucky
Registered historic places in Kentucky
commons:Category:Registered Historic Places in Kentucky
Religion in Kentucky
:Category:Religion in Kentucky
commons:Category:Religion in Kentucky
Rivers of Kentucky
commons:Category:Rivers of Kentucky
Roller coasters in Kentucky
commons:Category:Roller coasters in Kentucky

S
School districts of Kentucky
Scouting in Kentucky
Senate of the Commonwealth of Kentucky
Settlements in Kentucky
Cities in Kentucky
Census Designated Places in Kentucky
Other unincorporated communities in Kentucky
List of ghost towns in Kentucky
Simmonds' Battery Kentucky Light Artillery
Solar power in Kentucky
Sports in Kentucky
:Category:Sports in Kentucky
commons:Category:Sports in Kentucky
:Category:Sports venues in Kentucky
commons:Category:Sports venues in Kentucky
State Capitol of Kentucky
State highway routes in Kentucky
State of Kentucky – see: Commonwealth of Kentucky
State parks of Kentucky
commons:Category:State parks of Kentucky
State prisons of Kentucky
Structures in Kentucky
commons:Category:Buildings and structures in Kentucky
Supreme Court of the Commonwealth of Kentucky
Symbols of the Commonwealth of Kentucky
:Category:Symbols of Kentucky
commons:Category:Symbols of Kentucky

T
Telephone area codes in Kentucky
Telecommunications in Kentucky
commons:Category:Communications in Kentucky
Television shows set in Kentucky
Television stations in Kentucky
Tennessee River
Tennessee Valley Authority
Theatres in Kentucky
commons:Category:Theatres in Kentucky
Tourism in Kentucky  website
commons:Category:Tourism in Kentucky
Transportation in Kentucky
:Category:Transportation in Kentucky
commons:Category:Transport in Kentucky
Triple Crown of Thoroughbred Racing

U
United States of America
States of the United States of America
United States census statistical areas of Kentucky
United States congressional delegations from Kentucky
United States congressional districts in Kentucky
United States Court of Appeals for the Sixth Circuit
United States District Court for the Eastern District of Kentucky
United States District Court for the Western District of Kentucky
United States representatives from Kentucky
United States senators from Kentucky
Universities and colleges in Kentucky
commons:Category:Universities and colleges in Kentucky
U.S. highway routes in Kentucky
US-KY – ISO 3166-2:US region code for the Commonwealth of Kentucky

V

W
Waterfalls of Kentucky
commons:Category:Waterfalls of Kentucky
Wikimedia
Wikimedia Commons:Category:Kentucky
commons:Category:Maps of Kentucky
Wikinews:Category:Kentucky
Wikinews:Portal:Kentucky
Wikipedia Category:Kentucky
Wikipedia Portal:Kentucky
Wikipedia:WikiProject Kentucky
:Category:WikiProject Kentucky articles
:Category:WikiProject Kentucky members
Wind power in Kentucky
Kentucky wine

X

Y

Z
Zoos in Kentucky
commons:Category:Zoos in Kentucky

See also

Topic overview:
Kentucky
Outline of Kentucky

Kentucky
 
Kentucky